Rustum may refer to:
 Rustum (1984 film), an Indian Telugu-language action film
 Rustum (2019 film), an Indian Kannada-language crime thriller film
 Rustum Ghazaleh (1953-2015), Syrian military and intelligence officer
 Rustum Kozain (born 1966), South African poet and writer
 Rustum Roy (1924-2010), Indian-born American physicist

See also
 Rustom (disambiguation)
 Sohrab and Rustum, an 1853 poem by Matthew Arnold